The 2007 Red Bull MotoGP Rookies Cup was the first season of the Red Bull MotoGP Rookies Cup. The season, contested by the riders on equal KTM 125cc bikes, began with one race during the Spanish Grand Prix weekend at Jerez on March 25 and ended with another race header at the Valencian Grand Prix in Valencia on November 3; another six European GPs saw single Rookies races on each Saturday, making it an eight-race championship. The French Johann Zarco was proclaimed champion after the penultimate race.

Calendar

Entry list

All entrants were riding a KTM
Tyres were supplied by Dunlop

Championship standings
Points were awarded to the top fifteen finishers, provided the rider finished the race.

References

External links
 Results at redbullrookiescup.com
 Results at classic.autosport.com

Red Bull MotoGP Rookies Cup
Red Bull MotoGP Rookies Cup racing seasons